Pakpak Bharat Regency is a regency in North Sumatra, Indonesia. The regency covers an area of 1,218.3 square kilometres and it had a population of 40,481 at the 2010 census and 52,351 at the 2020 Census. Its seat is the town of Salak.

Administrative districts 
The regency is divided administratively into eight districts (kecamatan), tabulated below with their reas and their populations at the 2010 Census and the 2020 Census. The table also includes the locations of the district administrative centres, the number of administrative villages (desa and kelurahan) in each district and its post code.

Demographics

Etnhic groups 
The tribes that inhabit Pakpak Bharat Regency in general are Pakpak people. Besides Pakpak, other Batak ethnicities include Toba and Karo; there are also other tribes such as Malay and Nias and so on.

Most of the territory of Pakpak Bharat Regency is the ulayat land of the Pakpak people Suak Simsim, so the majority of Pakpak clan in Pakpak Bharat Regency are from Suak Simsim. However, there are also other Pakpak clans from the other four asylums.

The Pakpak clans inhabiting Pakpak Bharat Regency include:

 Bancin
 Banurea
 Berutu
 Boangmanalu
 Cibro
 Kabeakan
 Kesogihen
 Limbong
 Manik
 Padang
 Padang Batanghari
 Sinamo
 Sitakar
 Solin
 Tinendung

Religion 

The number of houses of worship by type of places of worship in 2016 in Pakpak Bharat Regency is as follows:
 Church Protestant 98 buildings
 Church Catholic 13 buildings
 Mosque as many as 78 buildings

In Pakpak Bharat Regency, Christianity is the religion with the majority of the population, followed by adherents of the Islam religion which also has a large population.

residents of Pakpak Bharat Regency who are Protestant Christians are members of the Church GKPPD.

References

Regencies of North Sumatra